Anthidium rubrozonatum is a species of bee in the family Megachilidae, the leaf-cutter, carder, or mason bees.

Distribution
Africa

References

rubrozonatum
Insects described in 1984